Walther Reyer (4 September 1922 – 5 September 1999) was an Austrian actor. He appeared in more than 50 films and television shows between 1954 and 1997.

Filmography

References

External links

1922 births
1999 deaths
Austrian male film actors
Austrian male television actors
People from Tyrol (state)
20th-century Austrian male actors